The 1942 Philadelphia Eagles season was their tenth in the league. The team failed to improve on their previous output of 2–8–1, losing nine games. The team failed to qualify for the playoffs for the 10th consecutive season.

Offseason
The Eagles hold training camp for the second year at the High School Bowl, in Two Rivers, Wisconsin.

NFL Draft
The 1942 NFL Draft was held on December 22, 1941. The draft is 22 rounds long and each team get 20 picks. A total of 200 players. The Eagles get to select 3rd in each of the 1st 20 rounds. The top 5 teams record wise in 1941 do not get picks in rounds 2 and 4, as the lowest 5 teams do not pick in rounds 21 and 22.

With the over first pick in the draft the
Pittsburgh Steelers select Bill Dudley a Halfback out of Virginia he was the first Virginia player to earn All-America honors and was awarded the Maxwell Award for best college football player of the year for 1941.  He was also named the best college player of the year by the DC Touchdown Club.

The Eagles first pick in the draft is the third player is Pete Kmetovic a Halfback from Stanford University. He would not play Pro football until 1946 for the Eagles.

Player selections

The table shows the Eagles selections and what picks they had that were traded away and the team that ended up with that pick. It is possible the Eagles' pick ended up with this team via another team that the Eagles made a trade with.
Not shown are acquired picks that the Eagles traded away.

Schedule

On November 22, during their bye week, the Eagles tied the independent Wilmington Clippers 21–21 at Wilmington Park before 8,500 fans.

Standings

Roster
(All time List of Philadelphia Eagles players in franchise history)

References

Philadelphia Eagles seasons
Philadelphia Eagles
Philadelphia Eag